The Dad's Army Appreciation Society is an organisation dedicated to the British television show Dad's Army. It is run by a small group of individuals and has over 1,700 members.

History
The society was founded in 1993 by Bill Pertwee (who played Warden Hodges), Frank Williams (who played the Vicar) and fans of the show. The society, in association with the Bressingham Steam and Gardens, set up the Dad's Army Collection, which was officially opened on 14 May 2000 by Dad's Army creators Jimmy Perry and David Croft. Also, Thetford (where much of the show was filmed) opened a Dad's Army Museum in 2007. In 2003 the secretary of the society, Tony Pritchard, designed a heritage trail for Dad's Army fans, in part funded through a grant from the European Union.

As of 2009, the society had 1,700 members, having grown from approximately 300-500 members in 1997 and 1998.

Key figures

Events
The society holds many individual events around the country where they show and play rare Dad's Army items and footage. However, there is a main event in May/June when the society members meet up, have the annual society dinner, and go to the Dad's Army Collection at the Bressingham Steam and Gardens.

Events have included a gathering in 1997 at The Oval attended by a number of the original cast (including Clive Dunn and Ian Lavender) as well as the shows writers, Jimmy Perry and David Croft, and a 1998 gathering at Cambridge (New Zealand) attended by Stephen Lowe, the son of the show's Arthur Lowe who played Captain George Mainwaring. More recently, a 2009 gathering was held at Whitmore Hall at which Frank Williams was able to attend and speak to the society's members, and before his death Colin Bean (who played Private Sponge in the series) regularly turned out to events, even though he used a wheelchair at the time.
Since then (and from 1998) the Society have arranged annual events based at or around Thetford attended by the writers and cast members, including tours of the restricted Stanta Battle Area used for location filming.
The Society organised several events to commemorate the 50th anniversary of the Croft and Perry partnership in 2018.

Permission To Speak, Sir!
The society publishes a member's magazine called Permission To Speak, Sir!, three times a year. It includes society news, society merchandise and Dad's Army items for sale by members. Regular features are "Guest Appearances" and "Letters from Members".

In 2018 the Society published an updated version of the Dad's Army Companion to coincide with the 50th anniversary celebrations.

Video and Audio Library
The Video and Audio Library features a large selection of video and audio items that can be borrowed by members. In December 2020 a special section of the society's website was set aside for fan fiction written by the members, the first submission was made in January 2021 and was entitled Dad’s Army Negotiates Brexit and was by Niles Schilder.

List of Presidents

 1993 - 2013: Bill Pertwee 
 2013 - 2022: Frank Williams 
 2022 - present: Michael Knowles

References

External links
 Official website
 'Dad's Army Companion'

Dad's Army
Television fan clubs
Organizations established in 1993
1993 establishments in the United Kingdom